Litesport may refer to:

Freebird LiteSport II, an American ultralight aircraft design
Freebird LiteSport Ultra, an American ultralight aircraft design
Moyes Litesport, an Australian hang glider design